The Fabulous Thad Jones is the debut album by American jazz trumpeter Thad Jones recorded in 1954 and originally released on Charles Mingus' Debut Records label as a 10-inch LP.  The album was later re-issued as a 12-inch LP titled simply, Thad Jones.

Release history
The Fabulous Thad Jones (Debut DLP-12) was initially released with a total of 6 tracks recorded on 11 August 1954.  The 12 inch LP version, Thad Jones (Debut DEB 127), included an additional 4 tracks taken from a 10 March 1955 recording session that had previously been released as Thad Jones/Charles Mingus - Jazz Collaborations, Vol. 1 (Debut DLP 17). The 12 inch re-issue also replaced the original "Get Out of Town" with an alternate take and included an unedited version of "One More Time" different from that on the ...Jazz Collaborations... release.  Later CD re-issues include both versions of "Get Out of Town" and "One More Time" as bonus tracks.

Reception
The Allmusic review by Scott Yanow of the CD reissue, which also compiles tracks from Jones' second LP, stated: "The 12 performances (which include two alternate takes) really put the focus on Jones' accessible yet unpredictable style".

Track listing
All compositions by Thad Jones, except as indicated.

Thad Jones (DEB 127)
LP side A:
 "Get Out of Town" (Porter) – 8:43
 "One More" – 7:28 
 "Bitty Ditty" – 4:53
 "More of the Same" – 5:12
LP side B:
 "Elusive" – 5:12
 "Sombre Intrusion" – 2:46
 "I Can't Get Started" (Duke, I. Gershwin) – 6:06
 "I'll Remember April" (DePaul, Patricia Johnston, Raye) – 3:48
 "You Don't Know What Love Is" (DePaul, Raye) – 3:29
 "Chazzanova" (Mingus) – 3:41
Later CD re-issue bonus tracks:
 "Get Out of Town" (Porter) – 7:31
 "One More" – 4:00

Original 10 inch LP releases:

The Fabulous Thad Jones (DLP 12)
LP side A:
 "Elusive" – 5:12
 "Sombre Intrusion" – 2:46
 "You Don't Know What Love Is" (DePaul, Raye) – 3:29
LP side B:
 "Bitty Ditty" – 4:53
 "Chazzanova" (Mingus) – 3:41
 "I'll Remember April" (DePaul, Johnston, Raye) – 3:48

Thad Jones/Charles Mingus - Jazz Collaborations, Vol. 1 (DLP 17)
LP side A:
 "One More" – 4:00 (edited version)
 "I Can't Get Started" (Duke, I. Gershwin) – 6:06
LP side B:
 "More of the Same" – 5:12
 "Get Out of Town" (Porter) – 7:31
All track times are from CD re-issue

Personnel
Thad Jones – trumpet
Charles Mingus – bass
On the 1954 The Fabulous Thad Jones tracks:
Frank Wess – tenor saxophone, flute 
Hank Jones – piano
Kenny Clarke – drums
On the 1955 Thad Jones / Charles Mingus Jazz Collaborations Vol. 1 tracks:
John Dennis – piano
Max Roach – drums

References 

Debut Records albums
Thad Jones albums
1954 albums